Artesia is the historical Latin and Spanish name of Artois in northern France. The name ultimately derived from the Belgic tribe the Atrebates. The county gave its name to Artesian wells, which were drilled there since the 12th century.

Artesia may also refer to:

Places
Botswana
 Artisia
United States
 Artesia, California
 Artesia, Colorado (obsolete name for the town of Dinosaur, Colorado)
 Artesia, Mississippi
 Artesia, New Mexico
 Artesia Wells, Texas
 Artesia Beach, Wisconsin

Companies
 Artesia Digital Media Group, a Digital Asset Management software company owned by Open Text
 Artesia Banking Corporation since March 2001 a sub of Dexia Bank
 Banque Artesia Nederland since October 2006 a sub of GE Commercial Finance
 Artesia (railways), a French-Italian train company

Other
 Artesia High School located in Artesia, New Mexico
 Artesia High School located in Lakewood, California
 Artesia (comics), a comic book series
 Artesia: Adventures in the Known World, role-playing game based on Artesia comic book series
 Artesia Som Deikun, better known as Sayla Mass, a fictional character in Mobile Suit Gundam anime series